Kentucky's 8th congressional district was a district of the United States House of Representatives in Kentucky. It was lost to redistricting in 1963. Its last Representative was Eugene Siler.

List of members representing the district

References

 Congressional Biographical Directory of the United States 1774–present
 Redistricting in the United States

08
Former congressional districts of the United States
Constituencies established in 1813
1813 establishments in Kentucky
Constituencies disestablished in 1933
1933 disestablishments in Kentucky
Constituencies established in 1935
1935 establishments in Kentucky
Constituencies disestablished in 1963
1963 disestablishments in Kentucky